"Hard Place" is a song by American singer H.E.R. released on  as the first single from her fifth EP I Used to Know Her: Part 2 and the second single from her second compilation album I Used to Know Her. It was written by H.E.R., Sam Ashworth, David “Swagg R’Celious” Harris, and Ruby Amanfu and produced by Rodney Jerkins.

Music video
The music video for "Hard Place" was released on April 26, 2019. It features H.E.R. and a love interest who make music together until a promoter wants to recruit H.E.R. without her partner. The rest of the music video shows their relationship and the difficulties that they face as the singer's career rises.

Accolades

Live performances
H.E.R. first performed "Hard Place" at the 61st Annual Grammy Awards. She performed it again the following month on The Late Show with Stephen Colbert. She also performed it on Nickelodeon sketch comedy series All That on September 28, 2019.

Charts

Certifications

References

2019 singles
2019 songs
H.E.R. songs
RCA Records singles
Song recordings produced by Rodney Jerkins
Songs written by H.E.R.